The Alloway Township School District is a public school district that serves students in pre-kindergarten through eighth grade from Alloway Township in Salem County, New Jersey, United States.

As of the 2018–19 school year, the district, comprising one school, had an enrollment of 365 students and 28.5 classroom teachers (on an FTE basis), for a student–teacher ratio of 12.8:1.

The district is classified by the New Jersey Department of Education as being in District Factor Group "DE", the fifth-highest of eight groupings. District Factor Groups organize districts statewide to allow comparison by common socioeconomic characteristics of the local districts. From lowest socioeconomic status to highest, the categories are A, B, CD, DE, FG, GH, I and J.

Students in public school for grades nine through twelve attend Woodstown High School in Woodstown, which serves students from Pilesgrove Township and Woodstown, along with students from Alloway Township, Oldmans Township and Upper Pittsgrove Township who attend the high school as part of sending/receiving relationships with the Woodstown-Pilesgrove Regional School District. As of the 2018–19 school year, the high school had an enrollment of 603 students and 48.6 classroom teachers (on an FTE basis), for a student–teacher ratio of 12.4:1.

School
Alloway Township School serves students in grades PreK-8. The school had an enrollment of 362 students as of the 2017-18 school year.

Administration
Core members of the district's administration are:
Steven C. Crispin, Interim Superintendent
Shannon DuBois-Brody, Business Administrator / Board Secretary

Board of education
The district's board of education, with nine members, sets policy and oversees the fiscal and educational operation of the district through its administration. As a Type II school district, the board's trustees are elected directly by voters to serve three-year terms of office on a staggered basis, with three seats up for election each year held (since 2012) as part of the November general election. The board appoints a superintendent to oversee the day-to-day operation of the district.

References

External links
Alloway Township School District

Data for Alloway Township School District, National Center for Education Statistics
Woodstown High School

Alloway Township, New Jersey
New Jersey District Factor Group DE
School districts in Salem County, New Jersey
Public K–8 schools in New Jersey